Ivan Lendl was the defending champion, but lost in the quarterfinals to Mats Wilander.

Wilander won the title by defeating Guillermo Vilas 6–3, 6–4, 6–3 in the final.

Seeds

Draw

Finals

Top half

Section 1

Section 2

Bottom half

Section 3

Section 4

References

External links
 Official results archive (ATP)
 Official results archive (ITF)

1982 Grand Prix (tennis)